Stiška Vas is a small settlement in the Municipality of Cerklje na Gorenjskem in the Upper Carniola region of Slovenia.

Geography

Stiška Vas lies on a broad terrace south of Mount Krvavec and the valley of the Reka River. In addition to the village core with the church, the settlement includes the hamlets of Hribašek to the west and Škrjančevo to the east. Šipen Hill rises above the village to the north.

Name
The name Stiška vas appears to mean 'Stična village'. The locals explain the name as deriving from the obligation to pay a tithe to the abbey in Stična.

Church

The local church is dedicated to the Holy Cross and dates to 1751, when the old church in the center of the village was demolished and the current church was built on a small hill above the village. The church features Stations of the Cross painted by Leopold Layer (1752–1828).

Notable people
Notable people that were born or lived in Stična Vas include:
Ivan Železnikar (1839–1892), editor and journalist

Gallery

References

External links

Stiška Vas on Geopedia

Populated places in the Municipality of Cerklje na Gorenjskem